Luke George (born 30 October 1987) is an English professional rugby league footballer who plays for the Central Queensland Capras in the Queensland Cup.

Huddersfield Giants
Luke is already popular at Huddersfield. On his home début in his hometown, he scored a hat-trick resulting in the Giants merchandise teams selling 'Luke George wigs'.

Bradford Bulls

Mid-way through the 2013 season the Bradford Bulls announced that they had signed George for the 2014 and 2015 seasons by signing him on a 2 Year Deal.

2014

George missed the pre-season games against Hull FC, Dewsbury Rams and Castleford Tigers due to injury.

He missed Round 1 due to injury. He featured in Round 2 (Wakefield Trinity Wildcats) to Round 3 (London Broncos). George was injured for Round 4. He featured in Round 5 (Huddersfield Giants). Luke was injured for Round 6–7. Luke featured in Round 12 (St. Helens) to Round 13 (Huddersfield Giants) then in Round 15 (Wakefield Trinity Wildcats) to Round 17 (Hull Kingston Rovers). Luke featured in Round 21 (Huddersfield Giants) then in Round 25 (Castleford Tigers). George played in Round 5 (Catalans Dragons) to the Quarter Final (Warrington Wolves) of the Challenge Cup. He scored against Wakefield Trinity Wildcats (1 try), Warrington Wolves (1 try) and Huddersfield Giants (2 tries).

Genealogical Information
Luke George is the son of the rugby league footballer Wilf George, and the younger brother of the rugby league footballer Marcus George.

References

External links
(archived by web.archive.org) Luke George
(archived by web.archive.org) Wakefield Trinity Wildcats profile
Wakefield sign youngster George
George handed new Wakefield deal
Wildcats squad: Luke George

1987 births
Living people
Bradford Bulls players
English people of Jamaican descent
English rugby league players
Huddersfield Giants players
Hull Kingston Rovers players
Northern Pride RLFC players
Rugby league centres
Rugby league players from Huddersfield
Rugby league wingers
Wakefield Trinity players